Jimmy Wilson (born 20 April 1942 in Newmains) is a Scottish former football player and manager, who played for Newcastle United, Morton, Aberdeen, Motherwell, Dundee and Falkirk. Wilson also represented the Scottish League once, in 1967. He later became player–manager of Elgin City, while they were a Highland Football League club.

References

1942 births
Living people
Association football wingers
Footballers from North Lanarkshire
Scottish footballers
Shotts Bon Accord F.C. players
Newcastle United F.C. players
Greenock Morton F.C. players
Aberdeen F.C. players
Motherwell F.C. players
Dundee F.C. players
Maritzburg United F.C. players
Falkirk F.C. players
Elgin City F.C. players
Scottish football managers
Elgin City F.C. managers
Scottish expatriate footballers
Expatriate soccer players in South Africa
Scottish Football League representative players
People from Newmains
Sportspeople from Wishaw
Highland Football League managers
Cove Rangers F.C. managers